Heidrick & Struggles International Incorporated is an international executive search and management consulting company headquartered in Chicago, Illinois, United States. The firm also has a consulting practice focused on leadership and shaping corporate culture.

History

Heidrick & Struggles was founded in 1953 by Gardner Heidrick and John E. Struggles, both former employees of the management consulting firm Booz Allen Hamilton. Their first three clients were West Virginia Coal & Coke Corporation, Northern Trust and Continental Can.

The firm served as a launching pad for numerous companies in the executive search industry. In Spring of 1955, Heidrick & Struggles hired Spencer Stuart, who would eventually leave to start his own executive search firm, Spencer Stuart.

In 1957, Heidrick & Struggles began expanding outside of the Midwest with offices in Los Angeles, San Francisco and New York City. In 1968, the firm  established an office in London, and now has more than 50 offices in six continents.

In 1999, the firm became a publicly traded company on the NASDAQ.

Leadership 
Gardner Heidrick retired in 1982, and John  E. Struggles in 1986.

In 2014, the firm named Tracy R. Wolstencroft as President and Chief Executive Officer. He came to the firm after serving a 25-year career at Goldman, Sachs & Co. where he was a partner from 1994 – 2010. In 2017,  Wolstencroft became Chairman and Krishnan Rajagopalan was named the new Chief Executive Officer.

Acquisitions 

 In December 2012, Heidrick & Struggles acquired for $53.3 million Senn Delaney, a leading firm in corporate culture shaping, as part of a strategy to build a professional services firm focused on serving the leadership of top international organizations.
 In October 2015, Heidrick & Struggles acquired London-based leadership consultancy Co Company.
 In Feb 2016 the firm acquired Decision Strategies International (DSI), a leadership advisory firm.
 In Aug 2016 it acquired JCA Group, a London-based executive search advisory firm.
 In April 2021, it acquired Business Talent Group (BTG).

References 

Executive search firms
Business services companies established in 1953
1953 establishments in Illinois